The Diptych of Devotion was a small tempera and gold on poplar panel altarpiece painted in the 1280s by Cimabue. It is thought to have originally consisted of two panels, each with four scenes from the life and passion of Jesus. These are thought to have been split up for the art market in the 19th century.

Only three scenes from the left panel are known to have survived - Virgin and Child with Two Angels (National Gallery, London), The Flagellation of Christ (Frick Collection, New York) and Christ Mocked. The fourth scene is thought to have been The Betrayal in the Garden, in the upper register of the panel.

References

1280s paintings
Paintings by Cimabue